Batsto Village (or simply Batsto) is a historic unincorporated community located on CR 542 within Washington Township in Burlington County, New Jersey, United States. It is located in Wharton State Forest in the south central Pine Barrens, and a part of the Pinelands National Reserve. It is listed on the New Jersey and National Register of Historic Places, and is administered by the New Jersey Department of Environmental Protection's Division of Parks & Forestry. The name is derived from the Swedish bastu, bathing place (also the Swedish word for Finnish sauna); the first bathers were probably the Lenni Lenape Native Americans.

History
In 1766, Charles Read, a well-known ironmaster, built the Batsto Iron Works along the Batsto River on the site of the future village. The area had an abundance of bog ore which could be mined from the area's streams and rivers, and wood from the area's forests was harvested for charcoal for smelting the ore.  The rivers, despite their modest drop, were also harnessed for iron making.

In 1773, John Cox bought the Iron Works, which produced cooking pots, kettles, and other household items. Batsto manufactured supplies for the Continental Army during the American Revolutionary War.

In 1779, the Iron Works manager, Joseph Ball, bought the works and in 1784, his uncle, William Richards, bought a controlling interest. Over the next 91 years, the Richards family built most of the structures in the village.  Richards was ironmaster until he retired in 1809. He was succeeded by his son, Jesse Richards, who ran the operation until his death in 1854 and was followed in turn by his son Thomas H. Richards.  In the mid-19th century, demand for iron declined and Batsto turned to glassmaking, though without lasting success. Soon Batsto was in bankruptcy.

In 1876, Philadelphia businessman Joseph Wharton purchased Batsto along with a substantial number of other properties in the area. He improved many of the village buildings and was involved in a number of forestry and agricultural projects, including cranberry farming and a sawmill. After his death in 1909, his properties in the Pine Barrens were managed by the Girard Trust Company in Philadelphia.

Historic site
By the late 1930s, the houses in Batsto were "occupied chiefly by woodcutters and other members of South Jersey's forest people." Starting in 1952, the Air Force reviewed the Batsto location for an arms depot. Included in that construction was a plan for a "trans-ocean airport" and Congress was working on authorizing $73,523,000 for the establishment of a combined depot and air transport service. However, by 1956, the depot plans had shifted to Long Branch and the Air Force was no longer interested in this location. The state of New Jersey purchased the Wharton properties in the late 1950s and began planning the use and development of the property, allowing the few people still living in the Village to remain; in 1989 the last house was vacated.

After the property was purchased in 1958, the plans started with the restoration of the 50-room mansion and the rebuilding of the dam for recreation on the lake. After work began the property was concurrently opened to visitors. In 1959 the historic village of Batsto became the most popular site for that year as measured by visitors relative to other state historic sites. The historic village was dedicated on May 27, 1961 at 1:30pm.

In 1961, the visitor center was started. It initially housed the office, information desk, museum and an auditorium.

Today there are more than forty sites and structures, including the Batsto mansion, a sawmill, a 19th-century ore boat, a charcoal kiln, ice and milk houses, a carriage house and stable, a blacksmith and wheelwright shop, a gristmill and a general store. The Post Office is still in operation, and collectors have stamps hand-cancelled, with no zip code. The Batsto-Pleasant Mills United Methodist Church building, erected in 1808 as the Batsto-Pleasant Mills Methodist Episcopal Church, is still active as a place of worship.

See also

National Register of Historic Places listings in Burlington County, New Jersey
List of museums in New Jersey

References

External links

Batsto Village
 Batsto Village at Atlas Obscura
New Jersey Department of Environmental Protection– Batsto Village
Batsto Mansion and other area houses
Early history of the area
History of the Batsto Methodist Episcopal Church

Washington Township, Burlington County, New Jersey
Unincorporated communities in Burlington County, New Jersey
Unincorporated communities in New Jersey
Company towns in New Jersey
Ghost towns in New Jersey
Historic districts on the National Register of Historic Places in New Jersey
Museums in Burlington County, New Jersey
Pre-statehood history of New Jersey
Populated places in the Pine Barrens (New Jersey)
Living museums in New Jersey
National Register of Historic Places in Burlington County, New Jersey
Open-air museums in New Jersey
Populated places on the National Register of Historic Places